Groovefest Music & Art Festival - formerly Groovefest American Music Festival is a multi-day music festival held in Cedar City, Utah, United States. The festival is held each year during the final week of June.  It is a seven-day festival that is dedicated to American music, with genres including blues and folk, bluegrass, country, Americana, and jazz.

Past notable artists have included Trampled by Turtles, Pert Near Sandstone, Richmond Fontaine, Great American Taxi, 56 Hope Road, Bastard Sons of Johnny Cash, Cee Cee James, Stranger, Harper & Midwest Kind, Wayne "The Train" Hancock, Jackstraw.

The Groovefest went virtual in 2020.

2015 line-up
 Banditos
 Big Wild Wings
 Cale Tyson
 CAVE Women
 Chikano
 Jeffrey Halford & the Healers
 Erin harpe & the Delta Swingers
 Fernando Viciconte
 The Indulgers
 Melanie Davaney
 Mustered Courage
 The Naked Waiters
 Ragged Union
 Sammy Brue
 Way Down Wanderers

2014 line-up
 WILHELM (Cedar City, UT)
 LOVES IT (Austin, TX)
 BOTTLED MONKEY (Cedar City, UT)
 BLAMMITY BLAM (Cedar City, UT)
 SCREEN DOOR PORCH (Jackson Hole, WY)
 THE GOOD LUCK THRIFT STORE OUTFIT (Oakdale, CA)
 Harper & Midwest Kind (Michigan)
 STRANGER (San Diego, CA)
 JASON TYLER BURTON (Springdale, UT)
 ALICE WALLACE (Fullerton, CA)
 POEINA SUDDARTH (Los Angeles, CA)
 STEPH JOHNSON TRIO (South Park, CA)
 THE WARREN G. HARDINGS (Seattle, WA)
 FELIX Y LOS GATOS (Albuquerque, NM)
 BLAIR CRIMMINS & THE HOOKERS (Atlanta, GA)
 CEE CEE JAMES (Portland, OR)

2013 line-up
 AfroZep              
 Otter Creek              
 Loose Connection
 Victor & Penny
 D. Bess
 Woody Pines
 Levee Town
 Swamp Cabbage
 Rian Basilio & the Roosters
 Courtney Marie Andrews
 Melody & Tyler
 Water Tower             
 Bila Gaana
 Dirty Bourbon River Show
 Contino
 Ned Evett and Triple Double

2012 line-up
Claudia Russell & Bruce Kaplan (2005)
Nicole Campbell (2004)
Kate Macleod (2007)
Pete Anderson (2005)
Nowhere Man & a Whiskey Girl (2008)
Shawn Rohlf & The Buskers (2004)
Sister Wives (2004)
Chicago Afrobeat Project (2008)
John Batdorf (2010)
Hymn for Her (2011)
Trevor Green (2010)
Jackstraw (2003)
Traveler (2010)
Antioquia (2011)
Bastard Sons of Johnny Cash (2005)
Todd Wolfe Band (2008)
Thrift Store Cowboys (2007)
Karyn Whittemore (2005)

References

External links
Groovefest official website
Groovacious Records, Cedar City, Utah

Music festivals in Utah
Tourist attractions in Iron County, Utah
Cedar City, Utah
Performing arts in Utah